James Hagan (21 January 1918 – 26 February 1998) was an English football player and manager. He played between 1938 and 1958 for Sheffield United and once for England. As manager he had his greatest successes with S.L. Benfica in the early 1970s.

Playing career
Hagan was born in Washington, County Durham, England. Following in the footsteps of his father, Alfie, a former Newcastle United, Cardiff City and Tranmere player, Hagan represented England at schoolboy level and after spells with Washington Colliery and Usworth Colliery; he joined the groundstaff of Liverpool before leaving for Derby County at fifteen years of age. He stayed at the Baseball Ground until the age of twenty when United's manager Teddy Davison met his Derby counterpart George Jobey and haggled over the £3,000 asking price, eventually agreeing to pay £2,925.

With a weekly wage of £7 per week plus a first-team appearance fee of £1, Hagan made his debut two days later on 5 November 1938 in a 2–1 victory against Swansea Town in the Second Division. His first goal came 21 days later at Bramall Lane in a 3–1 victory over West Ham United. His first hat-trick for the club came in the last game of the 1938–39 season, with United needing to win to gain promotion instead of local rivals Sheffield Wednesday who having played all their 42 games were one point ahead on 53 with a superior goal average. Promotion was secured with a 6–1 win, Hagan contributing a goal.

After the war, Hagan initially refused to re-sign for United, missing the first four games of the 1946–47 season. Having got a job as a trainee chartered surveyor he only rejoined the team on a part-time basis. His solitary  England cap came in a 0–0 draw against Denmark  in Copenhagen  on 26 September 1948.

He continued to play for United until 1958, as captain between 1946 and 1949, despite United accepting what would have been a British record transfer fee of £32,500 from Wednesday in February 1951. Hagan rejected the transfer and Wednesday were relegated to the Second Division.

He finally retired after playing against his former club, Derby County, on 14 September 1957, having scored 117 league goals in 361 league matches. His testimonial game was played on 10 March 1958 between a Sheffield XI and an International XI.

In May and June 1958, Hagan joined fifteen Blackpool players on a tour of Australia. He scored 21 goals in his fifteen appearances. He had previously toured Australia with an FA party seven years earlier, scoring eight goals in a match versus Tasmania.

Managerial career

Hagan started his managerial career with Peterborough United where he worked between 1958 and 1962. His period in charge saw Peterborough United promoted to the Football League for the first time, and, in 1960–61, their first season in the league, they won Division 4, scoring 134 goals. This remains a record number of goals scored in the English leagues. After leaving Peterborough, he joined West Bromwich Albion in 1963 leading the team to the Football League Cup in 1966. Sliding fortunes in the season thereafter put an end to this assignment.

His greatest successes were with S.L. Benfica in Lisbon where he led the club between 1970 and 1973 to three successive Portuguese championships and once to the national cup, a record no coach has since been able to repeat at the helm of the Águias. In this period Benfica also attracted Europe-wide attention when the team reached the semi-finals of the European Cup, where the team was only narrowly defeated 0–1 on aggregate by the legendary Ajax of that era.

In 1972–73 Hagan led Benfica to become the first club in Portugal ever to win the championship without defeats and won 28 matches – 23 consecutively – out of 30, drawing the other two. In that year Eusébio also became Europe's top scorer with 40 goals, in what was his penultimate season as a Benfica player. The team scored 101 goals, breaking 100 only for the second time in their history.

Jimmy Hagan separated from the club in September 1973 after an argument concerning the line-up for the testimonial match for Eusébio. Eusébio, with whom Hagan enjoyed a lifelong friendship since those days, described the coach as "a strong disciplinarian".

"All the players thought his training schedules were too punishing and some were physically sick after the first training session. But after a while, they realised it was worth it as we started winning games. He gave us the extra strength and he is the reason Benfica won three successive championships."

In 1975, he managed Grupo Desportivo Estoril Praia for the First Portuguese League. In Lisbon he also managed Benfica's local rivals Sporting in the 1976–77 season. He also had spells at Vitoria de Setubal, Belenenses and Boavista where he won the Portuguese Cup.

Sheffield United career statistics

Honours

As a manager
West Bromwich Albion
Football League Cup: 1965–66

Benfica
Primeira Liga: 1970–71, 1971–72, 1972–73
 Portuguese Cup: 1972

Boavista
 Portuguese Cup: 1979

Portraits of Jimmy Hagan
A bronze statue of Hagan by sculptor Kenneth Robertson was unveiled at Bramall Lane on 19 January 2001 by the Portuguese football player/manager Eusebio. A portrait bust of Hagan was also presented to his daughter, Jackie. At the event Eusebio commented: Jimmy is still in my heart to this day and I can see exactly why he was so popular with the people of Sheffield. He was my coach at Benfica between 1970 and 1973 and I remember him being a manager who knew how to handle players well. He always offered me good advice and told me where I should be playing to get the best out of me.

References

Bibliography
Clarebrough, Denis (1989). Sheffield United F.C., The First 100 years. Sheffield United Football Club. 
Young, Percy A. (1962). Football in Sheffield. Stanley Paul & Co. Ltd 
Barnard Roger (2007). "The Jimmy Hagan Story",  The History Press Ltd.

External links

1918 births
1998 deaths
People from Washington, Tyne and Wear
Footballers from Tyne and Wear
English footballers
Association football inside forwards
England international footballers
England wartime international footballers
Washington Colliery F.C. players
Usworth Colliery A.F.C. players
Liverpool F.C. players
Derby County F.C. players
Sheffield United F.C. players
English Football League players
English Football League representative players
Aldershot F.C. wartime guest players
Huddersfield Town A.F.C. wartime guest players
English football managers
Peterborough United F.C. managers
West Bromwich Albion F.C. managers
S.L. Benfica managers
Sporting CP managers
Boavista F.C. managers
Vitória F.C. managers
C.F. Os Belenenses managers
English Football League managers
Manchester City F.C. non-playing staff
Expatriate football managers in Portugal